The Kaunas State Choir is a professional choir based in Kaunas, Lithuania, founded in October 1969 by professor of the Lithuanian Academy of Music and Theatre Petras Bingelis. The choir is noted for its collaboration with violinist and conductor Yehudi Menuhin. It has also toured internationally with productions of Handel's Messiah.

Discography
Beethoven, Symphony No. 9 Choral
Lithuania My Dear, National and sacred music by Lithuanian composers
Carl Orff, Carmina Burana
Schubert, Mass No. 4 in C major, Mass No. 5 in A flat major
Handel, Messiah
Haydn, Die Schöpfung/The Creation

References

External links
 Official Website

Lithuanian choirs
Music in Kaunas
Musical groups established in 1969